Flat Creek is an unincorporated community located in Benewah County, Idaho, United States.

References

Unincorporated communities in Benewah County, Idaho
Unincorporated communities in Idaho